A.C. Reynolds High School is a public secondary school located in Asheville, North Carolina. The school accommodates grades 9-12 and is a part of the Buncombe County Schools System. Mr. Ben Alexander is A.C. Reynold's principal.

Honors 
National Blue Ribbon School 2002

Notable alumni 
Karl Anderson, professional wrestler in the WWE
Luke Combs, country music singer and songwriter
Rico Dowdle, NFL running back 
Ben Johnson, Detroit Lions OC
Maria Fletcher, Miss America in 1962
D. Bruce Goforth, former member of the North Carolina General Assembly
Dr. J. Adam Lowe, Author, professor, and State Senator, Tennessee
Caleb Pressley, Barstool Sports personality
Chase Rice, country music singer, songwriter, reality television personality and Survivor: Nicaragua runner-up

References

External links

Reynolds, A. C.
Schools in Buncombe County, North Carolina